Blessing is an unincorporated community in Jefferson Township, Fayette County, Ohio, United States.

As of 1914, Blessing was described as "a mere hamlet", with no population recorded.

References 

Unincorporated communities in Fayette County, Ohio